Deven Shaw May (born April 3, 1971, in Whittier, California) is a Broadway performer, actor and photographer. He is most famous for his portrayal of the half-bat, half-human boy in Laurence O'Keefe's Off-Broadway musical Bat Boy, for which he won a Theatre World Award for "Outstanding New York Debut", as well as Drama Desk and Lucille Lortel Award nominations. He also performed as Bat Boy in London at the Shaftesbury Theatre. Among other credits, he appears in the films Temptation and Fabled.

Along with theatre and film, May is also a professional photographer.

May recently played Tommy DeVito in the National Tour Production of Jersey Boys, the Tony Award-winning musical. He later reprised the role of Tommy DeVito in the Las Vegas company at The Paris Hotel, which was previously playing at The Palazzo. May concluded his run as part of the Las Vegas Jersey Boys company on November 23, 2014, after playing the role for seven years.

References

External links

Official site

American male stage actors
American male film actors
Male actors from California
American photographers
1971 births
Living people
Theatre World Award winners